Nikos Androulakis (born 7 February 1979) is a Greek politician and president of the Movement for Change (KINAL) and the Panhellenic Socialist Movement (PASOK) since 2021. In 2014 and in 2019 he was elected as a Member of the European Parliament (MEP).

Early life and career
Born 1979 in Heraklion, Androulakis studied civil engineering at the Democritus University of Thrace, from where he also received a MSc in "New Materials and Environment". He has worked in the tourism industry and as a civil engineer, he also gave courses in the School of Pedagogical and Technological Education.

Political career

Career in national politics
In 2001 Androulakis became a member of the Central Council of PASOK Youth and in 2008 he was appointed member of the National Council of PASOK. On 4 March 2013 he was elected member of the central political committee of PASOK, which on its first session on 14 March 2013 elected him the new political secretary.

Member of the European Parliament, 2014–present
In the 2014 European Parliament election, Androulakis was elected one of two MEPs on PASOK's Elia list. He affiliates with the parliamentary group of the Progressive Alliance of Socialists and Democrats (S&D) and is member of the Committee on Foreign Affairs. 

In addition to his committee assignments, Androulakis is part of the parliament's delegation for relations with China. He is also a member of the MEPs Against Cancer group.

Androulakis won the race to lead the KINAL and PASOK over former Prime Minister George Papandreou on 12 December 2021 to succeed deceased Fofi Gennimata.

Wiretapping Androulakis 
In June 2022, experts notified Androulakis that, in September 2021, weeks after declaring he would be a candidate to lead PASOK, he had received a text message with a link that would have installed the spyware Predator on his phone, had he clicked on it. Shortly after, he filed a complaint with Greece's Supreme Court over an attempted bugging of his mobile phone with surveillance software. The ensuing scandal led to the resignations of the chief of the Greek National Intelligence Service (EYP), Panagiotis Kontoleon, as well as the Secretary General and nephew of the Prime Minister, Grigoris Dimitriadis.

References

External links
  
 
 Member profile on the website of the S&D parliamentary group
 

1979 births
Living people
Politicians from Heraklion
Democritus University of Thrace alumni
Leaders of PASOK
PASOK MEPs
MEPs for Greece 2014–2019
MEPs for Greece 2019–2024

21st-century Greek politicians
Greek civil engineers